The San Diego Spirit was a professional soccer team that played in the Women's United Soccer Association. The team played at Torero Stadium on the campus of the University of San Diego in San Diego, California. The team began play in 2001. The league announced on September 15, 2003, it was suspending operations.

The founding members of the Spirit were Julie Foudy, Shannon MacMillan and Joy Fawcett. The team reached the playoffs in the 2003 season, losing to the Atlanta Beat in the semifinals. Other notable members of the Spirit included Scotland's Julie Fleeting, Brazil's Daniela and Canada's Christine Latham, as well as U.S. national team players Jenni Branam, Aly Wagner and Shannon Boxx.

Year-by-year

Players
The "founding players" of the Spirit were Julie Foudy, Shannon MacMillan and Joy Fawcett of the 1999 U.S. Women's World Cup team.

2003 Roster 

Coach: Omid Namazi

Coaches
 Carlos Juarez (2001-2002)
 Kevin Crow (2002)
 Omid Namazi (2003)

League suspension

The WUSA announced on September 15, 2003, that it was suspending operations.

See also

 List of soccer clubs in the United States
 Women's association football

References

External links
Soccertimes

 
Defunct soccer clubs in California
Women's soccer clubs in the United States
Women's United Soccer Association teams
Association football clubs established in 2001
2001 establishments in California
2003 disestablishments in California
Soccer clubs in California
Association football clubs disestablished in 2003